Petko Tsvetanov Petkov (born 29 March 1968) is a Bulgarian football manager and former player. He played as forward.

Career

As a player

Petkov began his career at FC Lulin, training in the youth team between 1976 and 1986. From 1986 to 1988 he served his duty in the army. From 1988 to 1991 Petkov played for Akademik, in the Bulgarian "B" group, and from 1991 to 1993 he played for Septemvri. He retired from football in 1993 after being diagnosed with an abductor injury.

As a manager
Petkov was youth coach at Septemvri from 1995 until 2008. He helped Septemvri to win a total of eighteen awards during his stay in the club. 
He discovered a number of talented players, including Ivan Ivanov, Ivan Karadjov, Stefan Pavlov, Georgi Sokolov, Trifon Trifonov, Alexander Tonev, Alexander Vasilev, Bojidar Lazov, Hristo Surmov, Veselin Mitrev, Spas Popov, Apostol Delev and Garra Mladenov.

He was appointed manager of CSKA 1948 in August 2018.

He was appointed manager of Etar in December 2019.

References 

1968 births
Living people
Footballers from Sofia
Bulgarian footballers
Bulgarian football managers
Akademik Sofia players
FC Septemvri Sofia players
PFC Litex Lovech managers
Association football forwards
FC CSKA 1948 Sofia managers